This is a list of Georgian Asia Pacific Screen Awards winners and nominees. This list details the performances of Georgian actors, actresses, and films that have either been submitted or nominated for, or have won, an Asia Pacific Screen Award.

Awards and nominations

Nominations – 8
Wins – 3

See also
 List of Georgian submissions for the Academy Award for Best International Feature Film

References

External links
 Nominees and winners at the Asia Pacific Screen Awards website

Asia Pacific Screen Awards
Georgia
Asia Pacific Screen Awards